Barrington Apartments is a property in Fargo, North Dakota that was listed on the National Register of Historic Places in 1989.

It was built in 1923 in Tudor Revival and Elizabethan Revival style, and was designed by Joseph E. Rosatti and built by Anderson & Olson.

It has a crenelated parapet. "Complex brick patterns and the raked velour dark red brick further the romantic feeling."

References

Buildings and structures in Fargo, North Dakota
Residential buildings completed in 1923
Tudor Revival architecture in North Dakota
Residential buildings on the National Register of Historic Places in North Dakota
Apartment buildings in North Dakota
National Register of Historic Places in Cass County, North Dakota
1923 establishments in North Dakota